Tore Øvrebø (born 25 August 1965) is a Norwegian rower. He competed in the men's coxless pair event at the 1988 Summer Olympics.

Øvrebø has also been a rowing coach, coaching Olaf Tufte. In 2013, he became acting director of Olympiatoppen, succeeding Jarle Aambø. The position was later made permanent.

References

1965 births
Living people
Norwegian male rowers
Olympic rowers of Norway
Rowers at the 1988 Summer Olympics
Sportspeople from Stavanger
Norwegian sports coaches
Norwegian sports executives and administrators